News television channels are television channels that are devoted exclusively to delivering news continuously, without pause throughout the entire day. Such channels cover world news events, and national news, and may cover news items related to localities if such items have national or world significance.

Most international news channels are broadcast on cable, satellite or the Internet, and many have diversified their staff by broadcasting to multiple large language markets.  Like other means of news broadcasting, international news channels have become a fiercely competitive market.  Many governments, for example, have established and funded international news channels in order to offer their perspective on events, often in competition against more established foreign or domestic competitors.

Some news channels consist of live streaming world news, that is round-the-clock news channels which are transmitted through video streaming on websites or online platforms, and not through the conventional broadcast methods via cable television or via antenna transmissions.

The following is a non-exhaustive list of news channels in alphabetical order regardless of language or country of origin.

General news channels

Business news channels

Sport news channels

Weather news channels

Defunct channels

See also
 List of news presenters
 International news channels

References

 
News channel
Journalism lists